Olga Danilović was the defending champion, but chose not to participate.

Nina Stojanović won the title, defeating Katharina Hobgarski in the final, 6–0, 7–5.

Seeds

Draw

Finals

Top half

Bottom half

References

Main Draw

Reinert Open - Singles
Reinert Open